Live in 2004 is a live-double album released on August 3, 2004 by the Washington, D.C.-based go-go band Rare Essence. The album was recorded live at The Classics Nightclub in Suitland, Maryland, and consists of an audio CD of the concert, and a video DVD of the same concert.

Track listing

Personnel

Andre "Whiteboy" Johnson – lead guitar, vocals
Michael Baker – bass guitar
Milton "Go-Go Mickey" Freeman – congas, percussions
Quentin "Shorty Dud" Ivey – percussions
Mike "Lil Mike" Smith – drums
Kent "Hot Dog" Wood – keyboards
Roy "RB" Battle – keyboards, trombone
Quentin "Shorty Dud" Ivey – rototoms, timbales
Dave "32" Ellis – vocals
Charles "Shorty" Garris – vocals

References

External links
Live in 2004 at Discogs

2004 live albums
Rare Essence albums